Guillaume François d'Aigremont (1 April 1770 – 7 January 1827) was a French general de brigade (brigadier general).

He born in Paris. He fought at the Battle of Marengo in 1800 and the Battle of Maria in Spain during the Peninsular War. He was made a baron during the First French Empire by Napoleon Bonaparte. He was an officer of the Legion of Honour and a knight of the Order of Saint Louis.

Notes

References

1770 births
1827 deaths
Military personnel from Paris
Barons of the First French Empire
Officiers of the Légion d'honneur
Knights of the Order of Saint Louis